Review Youth Canvassing was one of many local programs in which members of the Seventh-Day Adventist church who are considered youth conduct canvassing and door-to-door sales of materials developed by the Review and Herald Publishing Association, which later merged with Pacific Press. The materials sold are usually “magabooks,” and groups like Review Youth Canvassing are called Magabook Programs and still exist. These youth programs are separate from the Seventh-Day Adventist Literature Evangelist programs.

History 
Magabook Programs are a form of colportage. Ellen G. White supported canvassing.

Activities 
Review Youth Canvassing, like other Magabook Programs, involved youth going door-to-door selling Seventh-Day Adventist written materials and discussing beliefs. Some programs list the benefits as helping build life skills such as communication and team work. Sales may also help offset the cost of attending Seventh-Day Adventist private schools.

References

Seventh-day Adventist media